The HVDC Italy–Greece is a monopolar submarine power cable link between Italy and Greece with a maximum transmission power of 500 megawatts. It went in service in 2001.

Sites

See also

External links

  ABB website on HVDC Italy-Greece
 THE ITALY-GREECE HVDC LINK .pdf

Energy infrastructure completed in 2001
HVDC transmission lines
Italy-Greece
Electric power infrastructure in Italy
Electric power infrastructure in Greece
Greece–Italy relations
2001 establishments in Italy
2001 establishments in Greece